State Route 49 (SR 49) is an  state highway in the central and eastern parts of the U.S. state of Alabama. The southern terminus of the highway is at an interchange with Interstate 85 (I-85) at Franklin in Macon County. The northern terminus of the highway is at an intersection with SR 281 east of Cheaha State Park in southern Cleburne County.

Route description

Alabama State Route 49 has its northern terminus at Alabama State Route 281, which provides access to Cheaha State Park and  Oxford. This junction is at about 1200ft, 1200ft below the highest point in the state (Mount Cheaha), just a few miles southwest. This junction is in  Cleburne County, which the route spends less than a mile in.

Quickly descending down the mountain into rural  Clay County, the route winds its way south through foothills to  Lineville, where it junctions with Alabama State Route 9. A few miles south of Lineville is a two-mile concurrency with Alabama State Route 77. 

Crossing into  Tallapoosa County several miles later, the route crosses through  Goldville before reaching  New Site, the location of a mile-long concurrency with Alabama State Route 22. It then winds its way south through  Jacksons' Gap and reaches  Dadeville, the location of a mile-long concurrency with  U.S. Route 280. 

After weaving through rural Tallapoosa County for several more miles, the route crosses into  Macon County, where it enters  Franklin. It makes a left turn onto the right-of-way of County Road 36, which carries it to its southern terminus at  Interstate 85. Travelers can access  Auburn,  Atlanta,  Montgomery, and  Tuskegee from this intersection.

History

When SR 49 was formed in 1940, the highway traveled only from Tallassee to Dadeville. As a result of several northward extensions, by 1969 the highway extended to an intersection with US 78 near Heflin. In 1973, the highway was extended southward to its current terminus at I-85 in Macon County. When SR 281 was formed in 1995, the northernmost section of the route was truncated.

Major intersections

See also

References

049
Transportation in Macon County, Alabama
Transportation in Tallapoosa County, Alabama
Transportation in Clay County, Alabama
Transportation in Cleburne County, Alabama